P. foliata may refer to:
 Peperomia foliata, a radiator plant species in the genus Peperomia
 Pseudovanilla foliata, an orchid species in the genus Pseudovanilla found in New South Wales, Australia
 Pterostylis foliata, an orchid species in the genus Pterostylis

See also
 Foliata (disambiguation)